Jericho is an unincorporated community in Caswell County, North Carolina, United States. It is located south-southwest of Yanceyville, and south of Fitch.

References

Unincorporated communities in Caswell County, North Carolina
Unincorporated communities in North Carolina